Twelve Inch Singles (1981–1984) is a compilation album by American rock band Ministry, first released in 1987 by Wax Trax! Records. It comprises tracks from early non-album singles originally released on the label. The album was reissued by Cleopatra Records in 2014, including a second CD of early tracks.

Track listing

Original 1987 release

 Tracks 1 and 3 are originally from the All Day single.
 Tracks 2 and 6 are originally from the single The Nature of Love.
 Tracks 4 and 8 are originally from the I'm Falling single.
 Track 5 is originally from the Halloween Remix single.

2014 release

Disc One

Disc Two

Personnel
 Alain Jourgensen – vocals, guitar (4, 8), production, engineer (5, 7)
 Thom Moore – engineer (1, 3)
 Patty Jourgensen – additional vocals (2)
 Richard 23 – additional vocals (2)
 Stevo – additional percussion (3), drums (4)
 Jay O'Roarke – production (4)
 Lamont Welton – bass (4)
 Preston – horns (4)
 Steve Brighton – additional vocals (4)
 Jon Mathias – remixing (6), engineer (6)
 Sturm – remixing (6), engineer (6)
 Iain Burgess – engineer (8)
 Nancy Taylor – assistant engineer (8)
 Brian Shanley – album cover

References

1987 compilation albums
Albums produced by Al Jourgensen
Ministry (band) albums